Decarthria is a genus of longhorn beetles of the subfamily Lamiinae, containing the following species:

 Decarthria albofasciata Gahan, 1895
 Decarthria boricua Micheli, 2003
 Decarthria stephensii Hope, 1834

References

Cyrtinini